Aras Onur (born 23 April 1982) is a Turkish author, poet, and columnist.

Early life
Aras Onur was born in Ankara and is a graduate of TED Ankara College and University of Ankara. He started his literary career in the early 2000s. Openly gay, he has been often associated with local LGBT literature.

He is often identified as a socialist columnist in the media, although his conservative tendencies are also often noted.

Aras Onur was pointed as mastermind of "Kindle a Candle" protests, a wave of civil series of unrest in Turkey began on 11 September 2015. The protesters were led by a common manifest released by columnists of a national newspaper named Karsi, in which the slogan "Kindle a Candle, Stand Out" was captioned.

Career
His first book of poetry was published in 2004, called Sudan Masallar, integrating a wordplay in Turkish which could be construed either as "tales from the water" or "arbitrary tales". His synopsis text for a short film (Gıyabında Cam Kadeh) ("The Wineglass in absentia" in English) was awarded the second place by Istanbul Bilgi University in 2007. During the same year one of his plays, Üç Kapı (Eng: "Three Doors"), made its theatrical debut. He was listed as one of the contemporary Turkish poets awaiting translation, among Cemal Sureya, Birhan Keskin, Turgut Uyar, and Edip Cansever.

He had written for Karsi columns for two years as the acting-editor until he resigned from office in October 2016, following to ban of accessing to paper's website.

Corpus

Books

Stageplays

Released Works

References

In addition:
 Onur, Aras. Beylerbeyi'nde Son Tango. Istanbul: Hayal Publishing, 2014. p. 72.
 Onur, Aras. Sudan Masallar. Ankara: Sabah Books, 2004. p. 4.
 Bavulum Dolu Sanatla. Ankara: TRT Turkiye'nin Sesi Radyosu, live talk show 31 July 2014.
 Biz Bize. Kanal-B, live TV show 28 January 2015.
 Candemir, G. (24 February 2015). Kir; korkuyla vucut bulan bir kavram. Birgun, p. 14.

External links
 
 
 Beylerbeyi'nde Son Tango Official Webpage
 Official Blog in Turkish of Aras Onur
 Columns in the Karsi News

1982 births
Turkish male poets
Turkish LGBT poets
Gay poets
Turkish gay writers
Living people
People from Ankara
21st-century Turkish LGBT people